Datu Hoffer Ampatuan, officially the Municipality of Datu Hoffer Ampatuan (Maguindanaon: Ingud nu Datu Hoffer Ampatuan; Iranun: Inged a Datu Hoffer Ampatuan), is a  municipality in the province of Maguindanao del Sur, Philippines. According to the 2020 census, it has a population of 26,660 people.

It was created out of 9 barangays from the municipality of Shariff Aguak, and portions of 2 barangays from Datu Unsay, by virtue of Muslim Mindanao Autonomy Act No. 220, which was subsequently ratified in a plebiscite held on July 30, 2009.

Geography

Barangays

Datu Hoffer Ampatuan is politically subdivided into 11 barangays.
Kubentong
Labu-labu I
Labu-labu II
Limpongo
Macalag
Sayap
Taib
Talibadok
Tuayan
Tuayan I
Tuntungan

Climate

Demographics

Economy

References

External links
Datu Hoffer Ampatuan Profile at the DTI Cities and Municipalities Competitive Index
MMA Act No. 220 : An Act Creating the Municipality of Datu Hoffer Ampatuan in the Province of Maguindanao
[ Philippine Standard Geographic Code]
2007 Census Population Figures for Maguindanao
COMELEC - Plebiscite results for 3 new Maguindanao towns
COMELEC Resolution No. 8169

Municipalities of Maguindanao del Sur